Myrothamnus flabellifolius is a plant species in the genus Myrothamnus found in Southern Africa. It is also called the resurrection plant, for the speed with which apparently dead leaves revive when the rains come. (see Poikilohydry)

3,4,5-Tri-O-galloylquinic acid is a tannin found in M. flabellifolius.

Description 
Myrothamnus flabellifolius is a small resinous shoot that reaches 200 - 1200mm in height. It can be found in either single bundles or colonies. These colonies are commonly found to have extensive root systems. During the winter these plants are known to lose all of their leaves. It will stay in this state for approximately half of the year. After first rainfall, it can grow back its leaves very quickly. These plants were shown to have a noticeable difference in size, between its dehydrated state and re-hydrated state.

Myrothamnus flabellifolius undergoes a rapid transformation after rainfall, changing from a metabolically inactive state. It can also maintain all its photosynthetic apparatus and chlorophyll throughout all phases of life.  The plant is also able to fold its leaf and stems, to reduce the level of light being absorbed by the plant. Thylakoid membranes are stacked upon each other to reduce photo-oxidative stress.  Most of the mesophyll cells fold their cell wall in response to desiccation. Sclerenchyma and vascular cells do not fold, providing support for the plant. Once water is re-introduced, water absorption happens mostly via the roots, as leaves are unable to absorb any water at all. Water transport is aided with the help of lipids found in the xylem. The lipids help prevents cavitation which helps in re-hydration.

Taxonomy 
This plant was first described by Friedrich Welwitschs in 1859.

Environment 
Myrothamnus flabellifoliusis is a geophyte that can be found growing along mountain formations in central and southern Africa. It is typically found growing in altitudes between 500 and 1900m. Regions are characterized by high light intensity and, extreme temperature changes between night and day.  Winters are normally dry and summer is normally when rainfalls, however the lengths of these period can change drastically from region to region. It can be found in shallow rocky outcrops with soil depths of around 15 cm. It roots will expand to intercept water found in the hollows spaces between the rock.  Erosion debris is typically found surrounding its root system.

Uses

Cultural Uses 
Myrothamnus flabellifolius has been called the resurrection plant because of its ability to produce flowers after months of dormancy. For this reason, it has been known as a symbol of hope in African culture. Its leaves and stems are commonly used as tea and spices. Leaves can be used to make lotion.

Medical Uses 
M. flabellifolius is used by traditional village medicine men in Africa. Its uses include the treatment of: coughs, influenza, mastitis, backache, kidney disorders, hemorrhoids, and abdominal pains. When smoked, it has been known to help with symptoms of depression and chest pains. Leaves can be masticated to help with symptoms of halitosis and gingivitis.

References

External links

 

Gunnerales
Plants described in 1858
Flora of South Africa

es:Myrothamnus flabellifolius